Yaḥyā (or Yuḥannā) ibn al-Biṭrīq (working 796 – 806) was a Assyrian scholar who pioneered the translation of ancient Greek texts into Arabic, a major early figure in the Graeco-Arabic translation movement under the Abbasid empire. He translated for Al-Ma'mun the major medical works of Galen and Hippocrates, and also translated Ptolemy's Tetrabiblos.

Translation was not a fully developed skill: al-Batriq worked by a combination of direct word-for-word translation and transliteration of ancient Greek words into Arabic where no equivalent was to be found.

He compiled the encyclopedic Kitab sirr al-asrar, or the Book of the science of government: on the good ordering of statecraft, which became known to the Latin-speaking medieval world as Secretum Secretorum ("[The Book of] the Secret of Secrets") in a mid-12th century translation; it treated a wide range of topics, including statecraft, ethics, physiognomy, astrology, alchemy, magic and medicine. The origins of the treatise are uncertain. No Greek original exists, though al-Batriq claims in the Arabic treatise that it was translated from the Greek into Syriac and from Syriac into Arabic.

Notes

Greek–Arabic translators
Syriac Orthodox Christians
Melkites in the Abbasid Caliphate
9th-century people from the Abbasid Caliphate